Animal Planet Heroes is an "umbrella rotation" of reality shows on Animal Planet. These shows focus on various animal cops / animal protection agencies across the United States, with one show set in South Africa.
The shows include:
 Animal Cops: Phoenix
 Miami Animal Police
 Animal Cops: Miami
 Animal Cops: Houston
 Animal Cops: Detroit
 Animal Cops: San Francisco
 Animal Precinct
 Animal Cops: South Africa
 Animal Cops: Philadelphia

External links

Animal Planet original programming
American reality television series
American documentary television series
American crime television series
Cruelty to animals

sv:Animal Cops